Effie is a feminine given name, sometimes a short form (hypocorism) of Euphemia (Greek: Εὐφημία). Notable people with the name include:

Women
 Effie Bancroft (1840–1921), English actress and theatre manager
 Effie Boggess (1927-2021), American politician
 Effie Cardale (1873–1960), New Zealand community and welfare worker
 Effie Cherry (1869–1944), American performer, part of the Cherry Sisters touring vaudeville act
 Effie Crockett (1857–1940), American actress
 Euphemia Effie Ellsler (1855–1942), American stage and film actress
 Euphemia Effie Germon (1845–1914), American stage actress
 Euphemia Effie Gray (1828–1897), Scottish model, married to John Ruskin and John Everett Millais
 Effie Hotchkiss, American pioneering motorcyclist in 1915
 Effie Mae Martin Howard, real name of Rosie Lee Tompkins (1936–2006), African-American quiltmaker
 Effie McCollum Jones (1869–1952), American Universalist minister and suffragette
 Effie Neal Jones (1919–2002), American civil rights activist
 Effie Mona Mack (1888–1969), American historian
 Effie Pedaliu, British historian
 Effie Louise Power (1873–1969), American children's librarian and author
 Euphemia Effie Newbigging Richardson (1849–1928), New Zealand landowner and litigant
 Effie Robinson (1920-2003), American social worker and public housing director
 Effie Hoffman Rogers (1855-1918), American educator
 Effie Adelaide Rowlands (1859–1936), usual pen name of Australian-born British novelist Effie Albanesi
 Effie Shannon (1867–1954), American stage and silent screen actress
 Effie Smith (1914-1977), American jazz and blues singer and comedian
 Effie Anderson Smith (1869–1955), American painter
 Effie Waller Smith (1879–1960), African-American poet
 Effie A. Southworth (1860–1947), American botanist and mycologist
 Effie Wilder (1909–2007), American novelist

Men
 Elisha Effie Norton (1873–1950), American Major League Baseball pitcher

Fictional characters
 Effie Clinker, a radio character developed by Edgar Bergen
 Effie Deans, in Sir Walter Scott's  1818 novel The Heart of Midlothian
 Mrs Euphegenia "Effie" Doubtfire, a disguised character in the 1993 film Mrs. Doubtfire, played by Robin Williams
 Effie Grant Munro, in the Sherlock Holmes story "The Adventure of the Yellow Face"
 Effie Harrison, on the British soap opera Emmerdale
 Effie Kaligaris, in The Sisterhood of the Traveling Pants novels
 Effie Perine, Sam Spade's secretary in the novel The Maltese Falcon and its film adaptations
 Effie Rawlinson - character in The Case of the Late Pig; an Albert Campion mystery by Margery Allingham

 Effie Spicer, on the British soap opera Coronation Street from 1968 to 1969
 Effie Stephanidis, comedic television character, played by Australian actress Mary Coustas
 Effie Trinket, in the book series The Hunger Games
 Effie White, one of the lead characters in the Broadway musical Dreamgirls
 Effie, in the video game Fire Emblem Fates
 Effie, a non playable character in Street Fighter III

See also
 Effie M. Morrissey, a schooner used for arctic research
 Effi (disambiguation)
 Effy Stonem, a character on Skins
 Eftychia, a Greek given name
 Euphemia (disambiguation)
 Euthemia, a Greek given name

English feminine given names
Scottish feminine given names
Hypocorisms